Károlyi is the name of a Hungarian noble family and a surname, and may refer to:

 Károlyi family
Alexander Károlyi (1668–1743), first count
 Alajos Károlyi (1825–1899), Austro-Hungarian count
 Gyula Károlyi (1871–1947), former Prime Minister of Hungary (1931–1932)
 Mihály Károlyi (1875–1955), former Prime Minister of Hungary (1918–1919)
 Béla Károlyi (born 1942), Hungarian gymnastics coach, husband of Márta Károlyi
 Márta Károlyi (born 1942), Hungarian-born Romanian-American gymnastics coach and National Team Coordinator for USA Gymnastics
 Ottó Károlyi (died 2016), musicologist
 Tibor Károlyi (chess player) (born 1961), Hungarian chess International Master
 Tibor Károlyi (politician) (1843–1904), Hungarian politician and count

See also 
 Károly, a Hungarian given name and surname
 Karoli (disambiguation)
 Nagykároly or Carei, a Hungarian-majority town in Satu Mare County, Romania
 List of titled noble families in the Kingdom of Hungary

Hungarian-language surnames
 
Hungarian nobility